A lapa is a structure that is popular in South Africa. The word lapa is an indigenous Southern African Sotho and Tswana word; meaning Home. There are two ways of referring to this word, one way of referring to it is lapa, and another way is lelapa. In other words, the two words i.e. lapa and lelapa, can be used interchangeably. The word lapa can be translated into English as 'yard' (a house and the land attached), or as 'family'.

Culturally and linguistically, a lapa means several things. It means a family, the land on which the family lives, and also, specifically, the area right in front of the house as one steps out of the door. The lapa area is usually painted and decorated with traditional colours, and also decked with plants, and spiritually significant flowers. Also, in most cases, even a shrine to the great African ancestors is usually set up at one of the corners of the lapa. Traditionally, the family, or the lapa would gather here (on the lapa) for breakfast, lunch, supper, and to host guests. During important family events, the family usually gathers here in the lapa to commune with the family's great ancestors and to pour libations of traditional morula wine and mabele beer to them.

The area would usually have a high thatched roof supported by wooden poles. The lapa may be attached to the main house or may be a separate structure altogether, a few meters away from the house. Traditionally, there can be more than one lapa in a single yard. In some homes, there are lapas for the elders, and lapas for the younger relatives of the family. During weddings and other celebrations, temporary lapas may be constructed to cater for the extra guests which will be present. Some of the temporary lapas may also be used as kitchen areas or dining halls for the extra cooking and dining which would be taking place at such events.

Recently, lapas have become a significant part of South Africa's modern architecture, and they're now added in urban developments. Lapas have also become a normal sight at most of South Africa's lodges and guest houses. They have gained popularity and are now used as entertainment areas for braais (barbecues), house and kiddies parties.

Architecture in South Africa